Al-Muqdadiya District is one of the districts of Diyala Governorate, Iraq.

Districts of Diyala Province